The 1860 United States presidential election in California took place on November 6, 1860, as part of the 1860 United States presidential election. State voters chose four representatives, or electors, to the Electoral College, who voted for president and vice president. 

California narrowly voted for the Republican nominee, former Illinois representative Abraham Lincoln, over the Democratic nominee, Illinois Senator Stephen A. Douglas and the Southern Democratic nominee, Vice President John C. Breckinridge.

Results

References

California
1860
1860 California elections